Palacios is a city in Matagorda County, Texas, United States. The population was 4,395 at the 2020 census.

History
The native inhabitants of the region were the Karankawa people, whose initial contact with Europeans came in the 16th century when Spanish expeditions first traversed their territory.  In 1685, the area was explored by René-Robert Cavelier, Sieur de La Salle, the leader of an ill-fated French settlement attempt whose flagship La Belle was wrecked in the bay the following year.  In the 1820s, English-speaking settlers arrived and came into frequent conflict with the Karankawa, who were eventually driven out of the area.

Popular local legend states that the area was named Tres Palacios ("Three Palaces") several centuries ago by shipwrecked Spanish sailors who claimed they saw a vision of three palaces on the bay.  Historians believe it was more likely named for José Félix Trespalacios, an early Mexican governor of Texas.  The town was originally called Trespalacios, but shortened its name due to a nearby post office already using the longer version.

The future site of Palacios was ranch land until 1901, when it was put up for sale by the estate of the former owner, Abel "Shanghai" Pierce.  The land was purchased by a development company, surveyed into lots, and with the arrival of the Southern Pacific Railroad and the establishment of the Texas Baptist Encampment, it rapidly grew into a seaside resort town.  It was first settled as a community in 1903.  City government was established in 1909, and by 1915, Palacios was home to more than 100 businesses, with a post office, library, weekly newspaper, numerous hotels, and churches, as well as a large entertainment pavilion built on a pier in the bay.

In 1926, Camp Hulen (originally "Camp Palacios") was opened as a training center for the 36th Infantry of the Texas National Guard.  The camp was leased by the War Department during World War II, when it was developed into a major antiaircraft training facility with a peak troop capacity of 14,560, and also served as a detention center for German prisoners of war.  The population of Palacios boomed during this period, and the city hosted visiting stars such as Rita Hayworth and Glenn Miller.

After the war, Camp Hulen was closed and the local population declined.  The town was hit by Hurricane Carla in 1961, causing major damage.  Since then, the population has grown again, with the settlement of Vietnamese immigrants and other newcomers from all over the United States. In 1973, acknowledging the rash of UFO sightings in the area and the state, then Mayor W.C. "Bill" Jackson declared October 24 Palacios' "First Annual UFO Fly-In Day" and called on President Richard Nixon to declare the community the "Interplanetary Capital of the Universe." In 1991, a pavilion was rebuilt on the waterfront, and in 1995 the La Belle shipwreck was rediscovered at the bottom of the bay, becoming the focus of a major archeological excavation.  In 2009, the city marked its centennial with celebrations and other events.

Geography
Palacios is located on the Gulf Coast about halfway between Houston and Corpus Christi.  It is connected to both cities by State Highway 35.

It is located on the shores of Tres Palacios Bay, an arm of Matagorda Bay.

The Palacios area is known among birders for its wide diversity of bird life.  Since 1997, as part of the 15-mile-diameter Matagorda County-Mad Island Marsh count circle of the National Audubon Society Christmas Bird Count, it has consistently reported more bird species than anywhere else in the United States.  On December 19, 2005, a record 250 species were observed.

Climate
Palacios experiences a humid subtropical climate.

Demographics

As of the 2020 United States census, there were 4,395 people, 1,524 households, and 1,038 families residing in the city.

As of the census of 2000, 5,153 people, 1,661 households, and 1,244 families resided in the city. The population density was 1,021.4 people per square mile (394.8/km). There were 1,976 housing units at an average density of 391.7 per square mile (151.4/km). The racial makeup of the city was 57% White, 5% African American, 1% Native American, 12% Asian, 22% from other races, and 33% from two or more races. Hispanics or Latinos of any race were 51% of the population.

Palacios has a high percentage of Asian-Americans, as it is home to a large community of Vietnamese immigrants and their families.

Of the 1,661 households, 44.7% had children under the age of 18 living with them, 55.4% were married couples living together, 13.4% had a female householder with no husband present, and 25.1% were not families. About 22.0% of all households were made up of individuals, and 10.2% had someone living alone who was 65 years of age or older. The average household size was 3.08 and the average family size was 3.64.

In the city, the population was distributed as 35.4% under the age of 18, 9.1% from 18 to 24, 25.8% from 25 to 44, 18.6% from 45 to 64, and 11.1% who were 65 years of age or older. The median age was 30 years. For every 100 females, there were 100.9 males. For every 100 females age 18 and over, there were 95.7 males.

The median income for a household in the city was $27,623, and for a family was $35,518. Males had a median income of $27,483 versus $21,875 for females. The per capita income for the city was $13,107. About 19.8% of families and 24.2% of the population were below the poverty line, including 28.9% of those under age 18 and 14.3% of those age 65 or over.

Economy

Home to about 400 vessels, Palacios is the third-largest shrimping port on the Texas Gulf Coast, and has proclaimed itself to be the "Shrimp Capital of Texas".  The most common industries are educational services, agriculture/fishing, and construction.  The area has also long been a major center for energy production, and the county is positioning itself as an "energy cluster" for both conventional and alternative "green" power generation, with over $3 billion in new construction undergoing permitting as of 2011.  The local tourism industry is based on fishing, boating, birding and eco-tourism opportunities.

Government
The City of Palacios has a council-manager government.  As of November, 2022, the mayor is Jim Gardner. The former mayor was Linh Chau, the first Vietnamese mayor in Texas

Education
Palacios and neighboring areas are served by the Palacios Independent School District.  The school district includes Central Elementary, East Side Elementary, Palacios Junior High School, and Palacios High School (the junior high school and high school reside on the same campus grounds).

The designated community college for Palacios ISD is Wharton County Junior College.

Media
Palacios is home to the Palacios Beacon, a weekly newspaper established in 1907.

Infrastructure

Transportation
The city is accessed by Texas State Highway 35 and served by the Palacios Municipal Airport.  The Palacios Channel connects the Port of Palacios to the Gulf Intracoastal Waterway.  Greyhound Lines offers direct bus service from Palacios to Houston, Corpus Christi, and the Rio Grande Valley.

Notable people

 Daniel E. Flores, Bishop of Brownsville, youngest Catholic bishop in the U.S. at the time of his episcopal appointment
 William L. Jungers, anthropologist, best known for his work on the biomechanics of bipedal locomotion in hominids such as the 3.4 million-year-old Lucy
 Priscilla Owen, judge on the U.S. Court of Appeals for the Fifth Circuit
 Monty Stratton, Major League Baseball pitcher from the 1930s
 Alfonso Ortiz, Emerging Healthcare Leader, as voted by his colleagues on THA LDC May 2022

See also
 René-Robert Cavelier, Sieur de La Salle
 French colonization of Texas
 La Belle (ship)
 Karankawa
 Palacios Municipal Airport

References

Further reading

External links

 City of Palacios
 Palacios Chamber of Commerce

Cities in Texas
Cities in Matagorda County, Texas
Populated places established in 1903
1903 establishments in Texas